Walter Tost (1895-1948) was a German film producer and production manager. Much of his work was with Terra Film during the Nazi era. He was the elder brother of Hans Tost, also a film producer.

Selected filmography
 The Woman Everyone Loves Is You (1929)
 You and I (1938)
 Monika (1938)
 Love Letters from Engadin (1938)
 In the Name of the People (1939)
 Men Are That Way (1939)
 Alarm at Station III (1939)
 Love Premiere (1943)

References

Bibliography 
 Giesen, Rolf. Nazi Propaganda Films: A History and Filmography. McFarland, 2003.

External links 
 

1895 births
1948 deaths
German film producers
Film people from Berlin